Bartiromo is a surname. Notable people with the surname include:

 Cole Bartiromo (born 1985), American blogger and convicted felon
 Maria Bartiromo (born 1967), American financial journalist, television personality, news anchor, and author